The 2016 Monster Energy FIM Speedway World Cup Final was the last and final race of the 2016 edition of the Speedway World Cup. It was staged on July at the National Speedway Stadium in Manchester, England,. It was won by Poland, the seventh time they had done so since the World Cup was launched in 2001. They beat hosts Great Britain by seven points, while defending champions Sweden finished third with Australia in fourth.

Bartosz Zmarzlik, Patryk Dudek and captain Piotr Pawlicki Jr. all scored double figures for the Poles, with Krzysztof Kasprzak, who replaced Maciej Janowski in the side for the final, backed them up with eight points. Individual world champion Tai Woffinden lead Great Britain to second place, scoring 19 points.

Results

Scores

References

See also 
 2016 Speedway Grand Prix

2016 Speedway World Cup